The Pratt & Whitney PW4000 is a family of dual-spool, axial-flow, high-bypass turbofan aircraft engines produced by Pratt & Whitney as the successor to the JT9D.

It was first run in April 1984, was FAA certified in July 1986, and was introduced in June 1987.

Development

The 52,000-62,000 lbf (230-275 kN),  -fan PW4000 made its first run in April 1984, was FAA certified in July 1986, and was introduced in June 1987.
It powers the Airbus A300-600 and Airbus A310-300, Boeing 747-400 and 767-200/300, and McDonnell Douglas MD-11 widebodies.

It received 90min Extended-range Twin-engine Operations (ETOPS) approval at introduction in December 1994, and 180min ETOPS approval in July 1995.
In January 2000, it was the A330 market leader with more than half of the installed base and one million hours, more than twice that of each competitor.
The Advantage 70 upgrade package for the PW4168A, which powered around one-third of the active Airbus A330 fleet, was launched at the 2006 Farnborough Airshow, increasing thrust to 70,000 lbf (311 kN), and reducing fuel burn by about 1.2% as well as overall operating costs by as much as 20%.

The  PW4090 entered service in March 1997. The  PW4098 received FAA certification in July 1998 and was introduced on the Boeing 777-300 in September 1999.

In 2000, over 2,000 PW4000 engines had accumulated over 40 million hours of service with 75 operators.
In 30 years between June 1987 and 2017, more than 2,500 engines have been delivered, logging more than 135 million flight hours.

Design

The PW4000  has a dispatch reliability rate of 99.96% and is approved for ETOPS 180.
The average engine stays on wing 13,500 flight hours before a shop visit (a Shop Visit Rate of 0.073 per thousand hours).
It is claimed to be cumulatively 3.4 dB quieter than other engines in its class.

Like other modern aircraft power plants, it has a Full Authority Digital Engine Control (FADEC), for better fuel economy and reliability. Furthermore, single-crystal alloys allows higher temperature capability and PW's Floatwall combustor liners improve durability and maintainability.
Also, the Talon ("Technology for Affordable Low NOx") single-row combustor improves fuel-air mixing, for over 10% better NOx, CO, and HC emissions.

Variants and applications

The PW 4000 series engine family uses a numbering systematic with the last three digits (PW 4XYZ) as identification of the application and thrust power: 
 X describes the aircraft manufacturer for which the engine is approved. A "0" stands for Boeing 767, 747, 777; "1" for Airbus A300, A310, A330; and "4" for the McDonnell Douglas MD-11.
 YZ denotes the certified thrust in US pounds (lbf) in pro-mile fraction.
Example: A PW4077 identifies a PW4000 series engine certified for Boeing (777-200) and has a certified thrust of 77,000 lbf.

PW4000-94
Variants: PW4052, PW4056, PW4060, PW4062, PW4062A, PW4152, PW4156A, PW4156, PW4158, PW4460 and PW4462.
Thrust range:    231–276 kN (52,000 lbf – 62,000 lbf)
Applications:
 Airbus A300-600
 Airbus A310-300
 Boeing 747-400 (and Scaled Composites Stratolaunch)
 Boeing 767-200/-300/-400(Including ER Version and Boeing Converted Freighter version except -300F)/-2C/Boeing KC-46A
 McDonnell Douglas MD-11
 Boeing KC-46A

PW4000-100
Variants: PW4164, PW4168, PW4168A and PW4170.
Thrust range:  287–311 kN (64,500 lbf – 70,000 lbf)
Applications: the engine variants are designed exclusively for Airbus A330-200 and -300 (Note that this does not include the A330neo: -800 or -900).

PW4000-112
Variants: PW4074/74D, PW4077/77D, PW4084/84D, PW4090 and PW4098.
Thrust range: 329–436 kN (74,000 lbf – 98,000 lbf) 
Applications: the engine variants are designed exclusively for Boeing 777-200, -200ER, -300. (Note that this does not include the -200LR, -300ER or F).

Accidents and incidents

Involving PW4000-112 series

 17 March 2003, United Airlines Flight 842
 A PW4090 failed bearing caused the engine loss and the diversion to Kona, Hawaii of a Boeing 777-200ER bound from Auckland, New Zealand to Los Angeles. At 190 minutes this was the longest single-engine diversion on record at the time. 

 27 May 2016, Korean Air Flight 2708
 A PW4098 uncontained turbine failure caused an aborted take-off, on a Boeing 777-300 at Tokyo-Haneda Airport. 

 13 February 2018, United Airlines Flight 1175
 A PW4077 fan blade failure caused significant engine damage to a Boeing 777-200 on descent into Honolulu from San Francisco. Routine fan blade inspection in 2005 and 2010 had shown a crack in the blade's metal structure but insufficiently trained inspectors had confused it for a defect in the paint.  In 2019, an airworthiness directive mandated recurring engine inspections based on usage cycles.

 4 December 2020, Japan Airlines Flight 904 
 A PW4074 engine had a fan blade failure and associated engine cowl damage as the Boeing 777-200 was climbing out of Okinawa. As of March 2021 the investigation is ongoing.

 20 February 2021, United Airlines Flight 328
 Boeing 777-200's right hand PW4077-112 had a blade failure shortly after taking off from Denver, causing significant engine damage. Two fan blades had broken off: one had suffered metal fatigue and possibly chipped another blade which also broke off. The failed blade was compliant with the inspection interval set by the FAA following the 2018 incident. The FAA grounded the affected 777s and issued an emergency Airworthiness Directive on 23 February, requiring a Thermal Acoustic Inspection (TAI) of the -112 fan blades before next flight. Japanese authorities and the UK's CAA followed suit, grounding 69 in-service and 59 in-storage Boeing 777s. Most carriers had voluntarily grounded the aircraft before, except South Korea's Jin Air's four aircraft. As of March 2021 the investigation is ongoing.

Involving PW4000-100 series
  6 May 2014, Vietnam Airlines VN-A371
 Uncontained failure of a PW4168A low-pressure turbine's stage four causing an Airbus A330 rejected take-off at Melbourne Airport in Australia.

 13 February 2018, Delta Air Lines Flight 55
 PW4168 fire in an Airbus A330-200 climbing from Lagos (Nigeria) at 2000 feet.

  18 April 2018, Delta Air Lines Flight 30
 Airbus A330-323's PW4168A fire after takeoff from Atlanta, investigated by the NTSB and the French BEA. As of March 2021, the cause has not yet been determined.

Involving PW4000-94 series
 7 June 2017, Delta Airlines flight 276
 Metallic debris in a PW4056 tailpipe and a 360 degrees crack in the LP turbine case just forward or the rear flange caused a Boeing 747-400 cruising at FL320 to return to Tokyo Narita. All of the HPC airfoils from the 5th to the 15th stage were damaged with nicks, dents, and tears to the leading and trailing edges and/or were broken off at various lengths above the blade root platforms. The HPT and LPT also had extensive damage, and the LPT case had a 360° split in line with the 6th stage turbine rotor. The NTSB reports  airfoil fractures of the 5th stage compressor blade before the part was updated.

 20 February 2021, Longtail Aviation Flight 5504
 Boeing 747-412BCF PW4056 failure shortly after taking off from Maastricht Aachen Airport : falling turbine blades slightly injured two persons on the ground, the airplane was able to land safely at Liège Airport.

 28 March 2022, United Airlines Flight 134
 Boeing 767 powered by Pratt & Whitney PW4060 engines experienced fan blade separation on the right-side (number 2) engine during a flight from New York to Zürich. The incident occurred over the Atlantic Ocean. The aircraft diverted to Shannon Ireland and landed safely with 123 persons on board.

Specifications
The PW4000 is produced in three distinct models, with differing LP systems to address different thrust needs.

See also

References

Further reading

 PW4000-94 Product Page
 PW4000-100 Product Page
 PW4000-112 Product Page 
 

High-bypass turbofan engines
PW4000
1980s turbofan engines